Club Skirts Dinah Shore Weekend, popularly known as "The Dinah", is a five-day weekend getaway and music festival catering to the lesbian community that takes place annually in Palm Springs, California, United States.

History

The Dinah Shore Weekend was named after the late Dinah Shore – a singer, TV personality and renowned golfer, who was not a lesbian. Born Frances Rose Shore, in 1916, she lived in the Coachella Valley and is credited for having founded in Palm Springs the Colgate-Dinah Shore Winner's Circle women's golf tournament, now known as the LPGA's ANA Inspiration. The Dinah initially coincided with the ANA Inspiration tournament, which took place the same weekend. The first unofficial Dinah Shore Weekend took place in 1986 when women began to flock to Palm Springs in conjunction with the tournament. "Loosely organized events with boomboxes and alcohol" took place during the tournament in the late 1980s.  After-dinner parties following the golfing turned benefits for the Human Rights Campaign and the AIDS Service Foundation.

The first Dinah Shore event was produced as a one night party in 1991 by Mariah Hanson under her Club Skirts Presents The Dinah Marquee at the Palm Springs Art Museum. The early years had the event as co-produced by Hanson and Sandy Sachs and Dr. Robin Gans (promoters of Girl Bar in West Hollywood) beginning in 1992. In 2003 the TV show The L Word had an episode set as happening at the weekend, which helped heighten its visibility. The following year, attendance doubled - the Saturday night party jumped to 2500 from 1200 the year prior. In 2005 the partnership between Hanson and Sach & Gans dissolved, with competing Palm Springs parties happening the same weekend. That state continued until 2012 when Sachs and Gans relocated to Las Vegas for an event which was called Girl Bar Dinah Shore Week Las Vegas.

The event initially was viewed as a party weekend, with the New York Times in 2007 calling it "Girls Gone Wild for Girls" and Sports Illustrated calling it "lesbian spring break". Beginning in the late 2010s, the event started to rebrand itself as "the largest and most famous girl party music festival in the world" in an effort to move away from that image.

In 2006 Guinevere Turner featured the event in the TV documentary A Lez in Wonderland (original title: Broute-minou à Palm Springs).

See also
 List of circuit parties
 List of electronic music festivals
 List of music festivals in the United States
 Michigan Womyn's Music Festival
 SuperShe Island
 Women's Week Provincetown

References

External links

1991 establishments in California
Music festivals established in 1991
Lesbian culture in California
Lesbian events
Women's events
Women's festivals
LGBT events in California
Women in California
Electronic music festivals in the United States
Rock festivals in the United States
Dinah Shore

de:Dinah Shore Weekend